Ciara Everard (born 10 July 1990) is an Irish middle-distance runner. She competed in the 800 metres event at the 2014 IAAF World Indoor Championships.

Everard works as a physiotherapist.

Competition record

References

1990 births
Living people
Irish female middle-distance runners
Place of birth missing (living people)
World Athletics Championships athletes for Ireland
Athletes (track and field) at the 2016 Summer Olympics
Olympic athletes of Ireland
Competitors at the 2013 Summer Universiade
Competitors at the 2015 Summer Universiade